Paul Ryan and Meg Snyder are fictional characters and a popular couple on the American soap opera As the World Turns. Paul was played by Roger Howarth (July 7, 2003 – September 17, 2010)  and Meg was played by Marie Wilson (June 16, 2005 – September 17, 2010). The couple was given the nickname "PEG" (a portmanteau of Paul and Meg) by their fans.

History
Even though their characters were on and off the show for years, their storylines never really connected  until 2005.

The mystery of the missing child
At this time, Paul Ryan was living with Emily Stewart, and Meg Snyder had just moved in with Dusty Donovan. Their lives intersected over Paul's sister, Jennifer Munson.

Jennifer had borne a child fathered by Craig Montgomery, but Craig had secretly switched the baby at birth with another baby that died, wanting Jennifer to believe her baby had not survived. When Paul discovered the deception he, with Emily's help, plotted to keep it hidden, believing Jennifer was better off without Craig, a dangerous criminal then serving time. Jennifer, however, suspected that her child was really alive and was working with Meg's boyfriend Dusty to prove this. Meg had uncovered the truth but kept quiet for a time at Paul's request, as he had manipulated her jealousy over Dusty's feelings for Jennifer. When the truth came out, Paul was cut off by Jennifer and, remorseful, himself cut off relations with Emily, which led her to shoot him in the back and dispose of his body over a cliff.

Star-crossed lovers

Meg found and nursed Paul back to health in an abandoned cabin, while in town - based on planted evidence that suggested it had been a suicide - Paul was declared dead and his funeral arranged. Unable to resist seeing what his family thought of him, Paul attended the funeral, but accidentally alerted Emily to his survival. He hid out at the Wagon Wheel Motel, where he arranged a rendezvous with Meg. The pair were planning to run away together, but Emily followed Meg and saw them share their first kiss.

Paul's hiding was short-lived thereafter, as Emily told Dusty and Dusty showed up to fight Paul. After the fight, Dusty disappeared. He was, for a time, believed dead, and Paul and Meg each thought the other had killed him. Paul confessed to protect Meg and was charged; meanwhile, Meg tried to hide evidence she believed would incriminate Paul and was herself charged as his accomplice. Doubting Dusty's death, Paul feigned a reunion with Emily - even going so far as to marry her - in order to get her to reveal that Dusty was alive. She sent evidence of that to Paul's sister, Jennifer. Meg tried to help Paul find where Emily had hidden Dusty, and Emily observed them together, planting evidence that would lead to Meg's arrest. Paul explained the situation to Jennifer, who followed Emily and located Dusty. Emily attempted suicide after her plan was foiled, but Paul and Meg together saved her.

Paul and Meg's happy future wasn't assured, however, as Emily had become pregnant during her "reunion" with Paul. Paul was torn by his needs to be there for his child and to be with Meg, but convinced Meg to raise the baby with him. Emily agreed to allow doctors to take stem cells from her baby to save Jennifer's son, Johnny, who had a rare form of blood cancer. Both babies survived, but Jennifer herself contracted a fatal illness and died after forgiving Paul for keeping Johnny away from her.

When Dusty refused to testify against Emily, for her part in saving Jennifer's baby, Paul found himself unable to prove that Emily had attempted his murder. He and Meg became engaged, but circumstances would yet conspire to keep them apart, as Craig Montgomery was released from prison with a desire for custody of Johnny and a heavy flirtation with Meg. Matters came to a head when Paul secretly interfered in a confrontation between Dusty and Craig. Knowing what he'd done and that Meg would not approve, Emily revealed his actions at their wedding, causing Meg to break things off.

Visions and reunion
Soon thereafter, a devastated Paul nearly died in a car accident. He was saved by Meg, but left with precognitive visions. At first, thinking this a scam to win her back, Meg discounted his claims, but she became a believer when he correctly predicted a dangerous showdown with an angry widower at a blood drive. But though she believed Paul now, she had been shaken by the realization that an error on her part caused the widower's wife to die. She lost her job and began abusing alcohol and sleeping pills, having a one-night stand with Craig. Paul convinced her nevertheless to give him a second chance, and her willingness to trust him increased when she realized that he had genuinely changed and was using his visions to serve others.

External links
CBS Daytime
PaulandMeg.net
Soap Central.com

As the World Turns characters